Gamasellus morogoroensis is a species of mite in the family Ologamasidae.

References

morogoroensis
Articles created by Qbugbot
Animals described in 1979